Tapio Laukkanen (born 23 September 1969) is a Finnish rally driver. He was born in Lahti.

In 1996 he won the Finnish Rally Championship in a Volkswagen Golf GTi, in 1999 he won the British Rally Championship with a Renault Mégane Maxi twinned with fellow Finn, Kaj Lindström and in 2016 he won the Kenyan National Rally Championship in a Subaru Impreza

Other co-drivers include Jorma Kaikkonen, Risto Mannisenmäki, Tapio Järvi, Ilkka Riipinen and Rory Kennedy, Gavin Lawrence

References 
This article incorporates information from the equivalent article on the Finnish Wikipedia.

External links 
 Laukkanen's rally statistics

1969 births
Living people
Sportspeople from Lahti
Finnish rally drivers
20th-century Finnish people
21st-century Finnish people